The Lovozero Massif (Lovozyorskiye Tundry, named after the lake in that area – Lake Lovozero; the region is also known as , Lovozyorye) is a mountain range located in the center of the Kola Peninsula in Russia, between Lovozero and Lake Umbozero, and constitutes a horseshoe-shaped ridge of picturesque hills, that surround the Seydozero Lake. The slopes are covered mainly with spruce and pine. The highest point is Mount Angvundaschorr (1,120 m). The area around the lake is inhabited by Saami, and many place names are of non-Russian origin.

Geology

The Lovozero Massif is underlain by a complex of agpaitic to hyperagpaitic rocks containing minerals as eudialyte, loparite (an ore of niobium and tantalum), natrosilite (anhydrous sodium silicate), etc. At least 105 valid minerals have been described in the massif and 39  minerals were initially discovered there.  The only other areas with similar geology and mineralogy are Khibiny Massif (immediately west of Lovozero), Ilimaussaq in SW Greenland and Mont-Saint-Hilaire, Quebec, Canada.

Tourism
The area is relatively well accessible from railroads. In winter the area is accessible from Khibiny Mountains via the ice of Umbozero. In summer there are usable mountain roads and trails.

Toponyms in Lovozero Tundras

Settlements
 Ilma (Ильма)
 Puncha (Пунча)
 Motka (Мотка)

Lakes, bays
 Lovozero (Ловозеро)
 Umbozero (Умбозеро)
 Seidozero (Сейдозеро)
 Sengisyavr (Сенгисъявр)
 Rayavr (Райявр)
 Motka Bay (Мотка-Губа)

Rivers, creeks
 Ilmayok (Ильмайок)
 Elmorayok (Эльморайок)
 Seidyok (Сейдйок)
 Kiftuay (Куфтуай)
 Kitkuay (Киткуай)
 Uelkuay (Уэлькуай)
 Sigsuay (Сигсуай)
 Tavayok (Тавайок)
 Muruay (Муруай)
 Chivruay (Чивруай)
 Kuansuay (Куансуай)
 Iidichyok (Иидичйок)
 Vavnyok (Вавнйок)
 Koklukhtiuay (Коклухтиуай)

Massifs, mounts, passes
 Alluayv (Аллуайв)
 Angvundaschorr (Ангвундасчорр)
 Sengischorr (Сенгисчорр)
 Mannepakhk (Маннепахк)
 Elmorayok Pass
 Kuftuay Pass
 Chivruay-Ladv Pass (Чивруай-Ладв)
 Strashempakhk (Страшемпахк)
 Engpor (Энгпор)
 Suoluayv (Суолуайв)
 Punkaruayv (Пункаруайв)
 Ninchurt (Нинчурт)
 Mount Karnasurta (Карнасурта)
 Mount Kuyvchorr (Куйвчорр)
 Mount Kuamdespakhk (Куамдеспахк)
 Mount Vavnbed (Вавнбед) (per Pekov: Lovozero Massif p. 32)

References

References: Pekov, Igor: Lovozero Massif Vneshtorgizdat Publishing Moscow 2000
Khomyakov, A. P. : Mineralogy of Hyperagpaitic Alkaline Rocks Clarendon Press 1995

External links
Lovozero Tundras, In Russian
 Geology and minerals

Mountain ranges of Russia
Mountains of Murmansk Oblast